Mirza Varešanović (born 31 May 1972) is a Bosnian professional football manager and former player who is the manager of Bosnian Premier League club Sarajevo.

During his playing career, which spanned nearly 15 years, he competed in Bosnia and Herzegovina, France, Greece, Turkey and Austria, playing in France for Bordeaux and in Greece for Olympiacos among others. Varešanović also played for the Bosnia and Herzegovina national team in the late 1990s and early 2000s.

In 2010, he started working as a manager. During his managerial career, Varešanović managed hometown club Sarajevo on two occasions, Velež Mostar, Olimpik, the Bosnia and Herzegovina U18 national team and Tuzla City.

Club career
Varešanović started his career with hometown club Sarajevo, breaking into the first team in 1991, but getting only limited playing time. With the start of the Bosnian War, competitive football in the country halted and Sarajevo became a touring club. During one of these tours, Varešanović was spotted by Bordeaux scouts, and he quickly joined the French team.

A year later he made a move to Olympiacos, spending two seasons with the Greek outfit. With Olympiacos, he won the Superleague Greece in the seasons 1996–97 and 1997–98. He next moved to Turkish Süper Lig side Bursaspor, who he would go on to represent on two separate occasions.

In 2002 while back at Sarajevo, Varešanović won the 2001–02 Bosnian Cup. He concluded his playing career with Sarajevo in 2004.

International career
Varešanović made his debut for Bosnia and Herzegovina in an April 1996 friendly game against Albania and has earned a total of 24 caps, scoring no goals. He played in the UEFA Euro 2000 and the 1998 and 2002 FIFA World Cup qualifying campaigns. His final international was a July 2001 friendly against Iran.

Managerial career

Early career
After concluding his playing career, Varešanović was named Sarajevo sporting director, and held the position for two years. In 2010, he was named Sarajevo manager and led the team for one season and finished second in the 2010–11 Bosnian Premier League season.

In the summer of 2011, he was approached by Velež Mostar, and went on to lead the Herzegovina outfit for also one season.

Olimpik
On 5 May 2014, Varešanović accepted an offer from Olimpik. In his second season, he won the Bosnian Cup trophy and made historic achievement with Olimpik by winning the first trophy for the youngest football club in the Bosnian Premier League.

Varešanović left the club on 21 November 2015.

Return to Olimpik
Varešanović once again came back to Olimpik in June 2017, but again left the club the very same year in November.

Bosnia and Herzegovina U18
In 2018, Varešanović became the head coach of the Bosnia and Herzegovina U18 national team. He led the national team to 8th place at the 2018 Mediterranean Games in Tarragona, Spain.

Tuzla City
On 26 February 2019, Varešanović signed a half-a-year contract with Bosnian Premier League club Tuzla City. His first win as Tuzla City's manager came on 9 March 2019, in 2–0 away win against Krupa.

On 25 May 2019, after the end of the last game of the 2018–19 Bosnian Premier League season in which Tuzla City lost against Željezničar at home 3–0, Varešanović decided to leave Tuzla, stating "I've been here for about three months, we have achieved what we had planned, but I will not be the manager of the club next season. I'm just too tired for this time, and some other things have also happened which have added to the decision of my deparutre." He officially left the club a day later on 26 May.

Return to Sarajevo
On 12 December 2022, Sarajevo appointed Varešanović as manager for the second time. He suffered defeat in his first match back in charge, losing 2–0 to Zrinjski Mostar on 26 February 2023.

On 5 March 2023, Varešanović earned his first victory since his return as manager in an away game against Široki Brijeg.

Personal life
Varešanović's son Mak is also a professional footballer who played for Serie A club Udinese. His younger son, Dal, currently plays in the Bosnian Premier League for Sarajevo.

Managerial statistics

Honours

Player
Bordeaux
UEFA Intertoto Cup: 1995 (Joint Winner)

Olympiacos 
Super League Greece: 1996–97, 1997–98

Sarajevo 
Bosnian Cup: 2001–02

Manager
Olimpik 
Bosnian Cup: 2014–15

References

External links

1972 births
Living people
Footballers from Sarajevo
Association football defenders
Yugoslav footballers
Bosnia and Herzegovina footballers
Bosnia and Herzegovina international footballers
FK Sarajevo players
FC Girondins de Bordeaux players
Olympiacos F.C. players
Bursaspor footballers
FK Austria Wien players
Ligue 1 players
Super League Greece players
Süper Lig players
Austrian Football Bundesliga players
Premier League of Bosnia and Herzegovina players
Bosnia and Herzegovina expatriate footballers
Expatriate footballers in France
Bosnia and Herzegovina expatriate sportspeople in France
Expatriate footballers in Turkey
Bosnia and Herzegovina expatriate sportspeople in Turkey
Expatriate footballers in Greece
Bosnia and Herzegovina expatriate sportspeople in Greece
Expatriate footballers in Austria
Bosnia and Herzegovina expatriate sportspeople in Austria
Bosnia and Herzegovina football managers
FK Sarajevo managers
FK Velež Mostar managers
FK Olimpik managers
FK Tuzla City managers
Premier League of Bosnia and Herzegovina managers